Won Hee-ryong (born February 14, 1964) is a South Korean politician  who is the Minister of Land, Infrastructure and Transport since May 11, 2022. He was a member of the 16th, 17th, and 18th National Assembly, and a Supreme Council Member of the conservative Grand National Party. He was governor of Jeju Province until his resignation on 11 August 2021.

He is known to be a moderating force during his time in the conservative Saenuri Party (GNP's successor) and does not always adopt his party's policies and convictions.

Early life and education 
He graduated from the college of law in Seoul National University. He is well known for being ranked first in two major state examinations: the College Scholastic Ability Test (1982) and the National Judicial Exam (1992).

During his youth, he was a member of the Korean labour and student movements for 7 years, fighting for the right of labour and democratization.

Passing the 34th National Judicial Exam (1992) and completing courses at Judicial Research and Training Institute, he worked as a public prosecutor in Seoul, Yeoju, and Busan from 1995 to August 1998.

Political career 

In 2000, Won was elected as a member of the National Assembly for Yangchon A District. He was re-elected twice in 2004 and 2008.

He served as a member of the Science, Technology, Information & Telecommunication Committee, Legislation & Judiciary Committee (2002), Unification, Foreign Affairs & Trade Committee (2004), Finance & Economy Committee (2006), and Commerce, Industry & Energy Committee (2007) in the National Assembly.

He has been a member of World Economic Forum since 2003 and was elected as a young global leader by WEF (2005).

In 2005, Won wrote his life "I Am Dreaming Of Sub-Three."

In 2007, Won ran for the party presidential candidacy; he gained only 1% of the votes.

After retiring from the national assembly in 2012, Won ran and was elected the Governor of Jeju Province in 2014. He won re-election in 2018 as an independent candidate.

Won resigned as governor on August 11, 2021, to focus on his second presidential campaign. He survived primary and secondary elimination of the People Power Party presidential primaries and advanced to the final runoff.

In April 2022, he was nominated as Minister of Land, Infrastructure and Transport by Yoon Suk-yeol, then-president-elect. Controversies around his use of public money on omakase, and various traffic violations he committed over the years rose during his confirmation hearing.

Notes

1964 births
Living people
People from Jeju Province
Wonju Won clan
Seoul National University School of Law alumni
Hanyang University alumni
South Korean prosecutors
21st-century South Korean lawyers
Members of the National Assembly (South Korea)
Liberty Korea Party politicians
People Power Party (South Korea) politicians
Government ministers of South Korea